The Gallaher Shield is awarded to the winner of the Auckland Rugby Football Union senior premier competition, and was first awarded in 1922. The shield is named in honour of Dave Gallaher, an early stalwart of Ponsonby, Auckland and New Zealand rugby. Ponsonby are by far the most successful club in Auckland history, with 35 shield wins and 47 championships in total.

List of winners
The winners of the Auckland premier senior competition are listed below—including the winners for those years prior to the introduction of the Gallaher Shield in 1922:

Championships by club

1883–1921

Gallaher Shield era (1922–present)

1883–present

References

Rugby union competitions in New Zealand